Jani Lakanen (born 11 December 1976 in Lohja) is a Finnish orienteering competitor, winner of the 2006 World Orienteering Championships (Long distance).

He became world champion in relay in 2001, together with Jarkko Huovila, Juha Peltola and Janne Salmi.

He won the overall Orienteering World Cup in 2000.

He received a gold medal in relay at the 2002 European Orienteering Championships in Sümeg, and a gold medal in the long course in 2006 in Otepää.

See also
 Finnish orienteers
 List of orienteers
 List of orienteering events

References

External links
 
 

1976 births
Living people
People from Lohja
Finnish orienteers
Male orienteers
Foot orienteers
World Orienteering Championships medalists
Sportspeople from Uusimaa
Junior World Orienteering Championships medalists